Nashik has been the educational hub of North Maharashtra. The city has two state run universities: Yashwantrao Chavan Maharashtra Open University (YCMOU) (located near Gangapur village on the outskirts of Nashik) and the Maharashtra University of Health Sciences.

Colleges 

 KRT Arts, B. H. Commerce and A.M.Science College (K.T.H.M)
 K.V.N Naik College
 BYK College
 Symbiosis Institute of Operations Management

Engineering colleges 
 K. K. Wagh Institute of Engineering Education & Research
 NDMVP's College of Engineering
 Guru Gobind Singh College of Engineering and Research Center (GCOERC)
Sandip Foundation
K.V.N Naik College of Engineering
SNJB'S College of Engineering, Chandwad, Nashik 
 G.N Sapkal Engineering College, Nashik
 Indian Railways Institute of Electrical Engineering, Nashik  ( IREEN )
 Karmaveer Adv.baburao Ganpatrao Thakare College of Engineering
 Nashik District Maratha Vidya Prasarak Samaj's K.B.T. College of Engineering
 Shatabdi Institute Of Engineering, Nashik
 SND College of Engineering & Research Centre, Yeola, Nashik
 Matoshri College of Engineering, Eklahare, Nashik

Diploma in Engineering colleges 
 K. K. Wagh Polytechnic
K.V.N. Naik S.P. Sanstha's Polytechnic
 NDMVPS Samajs Rajarshee Shahu Maharaj Polytechnic
 Guru Gobind Singh Polytechnic
Sandip polytechnic
SNJB'S polytechnic Nashik 
Matoshri Aasarabai Polytechnic
Brahma Valley Polytechnic

Other
 Divyadaan: Salesian Institute of Philosophy

Schools
See List of schools in Nashik

References

External links
Education in Nashik
https://web.archive.org/web/20121205102953/http://www.nasikeducation.org/